Luan Rafael Domingos Santana (born 13 March 1991) is a Brazilian singer-songwriter. His first live album was a bestseller throughout 2010, selling over 100,000 copies.

Early life
Santana was born on March 13, 1991, in Campo Grande (MS). He first captured his family's eye at the age of three, singing Brazilian country music songs ('sertanejo' songs). He performed sertanejo standards such as Muda de vida, Chico Mineiro and Cabocla.

Career 
In 2009, Santana held 300 concerts in Brazil, featuring an average of 25 performances a month. In 2010, he was described as the "new phenomenon of sertanejo music" by Extra. Santana appeared at the 2010 Festa do Peão de Barretos, where he performed for a 50-thousand-people-audience. In 2014, he collaborated with Enrique Iglesias for the Brazilian version of "Bailando".

His album 1977 was nominated for the 2017 Latin Grammy Award for Best Sertaneja Music Album. In 2019, his album Live Móvel was nominated for the same category. In 2020, Crowley Broadcast Analysis ranked him as the most-played artist on Brazilian radio stations throughout the 2010s, with over 1 million total plays.

Discography

Studio albums

Live albums and video albums

Singles
2009: "Tô de Cara"
2009: "Meteoro"
2010: "Você não Sabe o que É Amor"
2010: "Sinais"
2010: "Adrenalina"
2011: "Química do Amor" (featuring Ivete Sangalo)
2011: "Um Beijo"
2011: "Amar Não é Pecado"
2011: "Nêga"
2012: "Você de Mim Não Sai"
2012: "Incondicional"
2012: "Te Vivo"
2013: "Sogrão Caprichou"
2013: "Te Esperando"
2013: "Garotas Não Merecem Chorar"
2013: "Tudo Que Você Quiser"
2014: "Cê Topa"
2014: "Tanto Faz"
2014: "Eu Não Merecia Isso"
2014: "Bailando" (Enrique Iglesias featuring Luan Santana, Descemer Bueno, Gente De Zona)
2015: "Escreve Aí"
2015: "Chuva de Arroz"
2016: "Eu, Você, O Mar e Ela"
2016: "Dia, Lugar e Hora"
2016: "RG"
2017: "Acordando o Prédio"
2017: Check-In
2018: "Mamita" (CNCO featuring Luan Santana)
2018: Próximo Amor (featuring DJ Alok) 
2018: Sofázinho
2018: "2050"
2018: "Hasta La Vista"
2018: "Acertou a Mão″
2019 quando a bad bater
2020: "Inesquecível"

Awards 

 9 times as “Best Singer of The Year” for “Melhores do Ano” (The Best of the Year) for Globo Channel.
 Nominated 4 times for Latin Grammy All time winner of Nickelodeon Kids Choice Awards, Troféu Imprensa (Troféu Imprensa Awards) and Prêmio Jovem Brasileiro (Jovem Brasileiro Awards).

Highlights 

 Today Luan Santana is the Brazilian artist who has spent more time in the American Billboard Social 50 chart, which places him as one of the most sought after music names in the world on social networks.
 In December 2019, he was crowned ‘The most important Brazilian of the Year’ (‘Brasileiro do Ano’) from IstoÉ magazine.
 52 thousand fan clubs in Brazil.
 Among the 100 most followed and engaged artists in the world on social media 3.5 billion views on YouTube.

References

External links

 
 

Living people
1991 births
21st-century Brazilian male singers
21st-century Brazilian singers
People from Campo Grande
Sertanejo musicians
Brazilian male singer-songwriters